Whirimako Black  (born ) is a New Zealand Māori recording artist and actress.

Black sings mostly in the Māori language, uses traditional Māori musical forms and collaborates with traditional taonga pūoro instruments. Her musical achievements include composing and singing the titles for the acclaimed Television New Zealand series, The New Zealand Wars, as well as composing with Hori Tait the initial title music for the Māori news programme, Te Karere. In 1991, she formed the female Māori band Tuahine Whakairo but left in 1993, to start a solo career.

Born in Whakatane, Black is of Ngāti Tuhoe, Ngāti Tuwharetoa, Ngāti Ranginui, Kahungunu, Te Whakatohea, Te Whanau-a-Apanui, Te Arawa, and Ngāti Awa descent.

Black bears a striking traditional Maori female tattoo, or tā moko, on her face, a cultural symbol of pride and beauty.

In the 2006 New Year Honours, Black was appointed a Member of the New Zealand Order of Merit, for services to Māori music.

Black  made her acting debut in the 2013 film White Lies. She was nominated for the Asia Pacific Screen Award for Best Performance by an Actress.

Discography

References

1960s births
21st-century New Zealand actresses
Living people
Members of the New Zealand Order of Merit
New Zealand women singer-songwriters
New Zealand Māori actresses
New Zealand Māori musicians
People from Auckland
People from Whakatāne
Ngāi Tūhoe people
Ngāti Tūwharetoa people
Ngāti Ranginui people
Whakatōhea people
People educated at St Joseph's Māori Girls' College
21st-century New Zealand women singers
Māori-language singers